Holovchenko, also transliterated Golovchenko or Golovčenko is a Ukrainian surname. Its Belarusian-language equivalent is Halouchenka/Haloŭčenka.

People

Holovchenko
 Arkadiy Holovchenko (born 1936), Ukrainian swimmer
 Ivan Holovchenko (1918–1992), Ukrainian militsiya general
 Lyudmyla Holovchenko (born 1978), Ukrainian sport wrestler
 Tetyana Holovchenko (born 1980), Ukrainian middle and long-distance runner

Golovchenko
 Estela Golovchenko (born 1963), Uruguayan playwright, actress, and theater director
 Javier Golovchenko (born 1974), Uruguayan swimmer
 Jene Golovchenko (1946–2018), American physicist
 Roman Golovchenko (born 1973), Belarusian politician 
 Yevgeni Golovchenko (born 1973), Russian football player

Golovčenko
 Sergej Mironović Golovčenko (1898–1937), Croatian-Russian writer and illustrator

See also
 
 

Ukrainian-language surnames